The 2011 Dayton Flyers football team represented the University of Dayton in the 2011 NCAA Division I FCS football season. The Flyers were led by fourth-year head coach Rick Chamberlin and played their home games at Welcome Stadium. They are a member of the Pioneer Football League. They finished the season 6–5, 4–4 in PFL play to finish in fifth place. The team was awarded White-Allen Most Valuable Player Trophy.

Schedule

References

Dayton
Dayton Flyers football seasons
Dayton Flyers football